Ayala Cove is a ferry terminal on Angel Island in Marin County, California in the San Francisco Bay Area. There is regularly scheduled passenger ferry service to Tiburon as well as San Francisco.

Service is provided by the Angel Island - Tiburon Ferry and takes 15 minutes crossing Racoon Strait to Tiburon Ferry Terminal. Golden Gate Ferry operates ferries to the San Francisco Ferry Building.

References

External links

 Angel Island - Tiburon Ferry and Tiburon Charters, LLC
 Golden Gate Ferry Angel Island Route Schedule

Ferry terminals in the San Francisco Bay Area
Transportation buildings and structures in Marin County, California